"Times We Had" is an alternative song by Kid Mac released on 14 December 2012 from the album  No Man's Land. The song, with re-written lyrics, is the theme song of The NRL Footy Show.

An acoustic version of the song was released on Kid Mac's album Acoustic EP.

Personnel
 Kid Mac - Backing vocals, lead guitar
 Andrew Jhavery - Drums
 Antonia Hanna - Lead vocals, lead bass

References

2012 songs
Kid Mac songs